Jack Cartwright (born 22 September 1998) is an Australian swimmer. He competed in the men's 100 metre freestyle event at the 2017 World Aquatics Championships.

At the 2016 Junior Pan Pacific Swimming Championships, Cartwright won gold medals in the 200 metre freestyle, 100 metre freestyle (where he set a Championships record of 48.91 seconds in the preliminaries), 50 metre freestyle, and the 4×200 metre freestyle relay, a silver medal in 4×100 metre freestyle relay, and a bronze medal in the 4×100 metre medley relay.

World records

Long course metres

 split 48.12 (1st leg); with Kyle Chalmers (2nd leg), Madison Wilson (3rd leg), Mollie O'Callaghan (4th leg)

References

External links
 

1998 births
Commonwealth Games gold medallists for Australia
Commonwealth Games medallists in swimming
Living people
Swimmers at the 2018 Commonwealth Games
Swimmers from Brisbane
Australian male freestyle swimmers
World Aquatics Championships medalists in swimming
Medallists at the 2018 Commonwealth Games